William Kensett Styles (11 October 1874 – 8 April 1940) was an English sport shooter, who competed at the 1908 Summer Olympics and the 1912 Summer Olympics representing Great Britain.

In the 1908 Olympics he won a gold medal in the disappearing target small-bore rifle, and was 9th in the moving target small-bore rifle event. Four years later, he won a silver medal in the 25 metre team small-bore rifle event, was 13th in the 25 metre small-bore rifle event and 27th in the 50 metre rifle from the prone position event.

References

External links
profile

1874 births
1940 deaths
English Olympic medallists
British male sport shooters
ISSF rifle shooters
Olympic shooters of Great Britain
Shooters at the 1908 Summer Olympics
Shooters at the 1912 Summer Olympics
Olympic gold medallists for Great Britain
Olympic silver medallists for Great Britain
Olympic medalists in shooting
Medalists at the 1908 Summer Olympics
Medalists at the 1912 Summer Olympics